The Kessler Plan was the City of Dallas’s managed growth plan from 1910 through the 1930s, authored by George Kessler, a city planner. The Plan was intended to create and contain the Dallas Floodway of the Trinity River, and combine the six rail yards at Dallas Union Station. In 1909 the Dallas Chamber of Commerce established the City Plan and Improvement League (later called the Kessler Plan Association) and hired Kessler to draft a design for a long-range plan of civic improvements. Kessler drew up his plan to solve many of the city's problems, including the uncontrollable flooding of the Trinity River, the dangerous railroad crossings, and narrow, crooked downtown streets, and the construction of a Central Boulevard. The plan was not implemented at the time because it was not believed to be practical, but it became increasingly clear that changes were needed. Kessler returned in 1918 to act as consulting engineer for the Dallas Property Owners' Association and in 1919 began working for the Metropolitan Development Association of the Dallas Chamber of Commerce. He remained in Dallas until January 3, 1922, when he returned to St. Louis. Although Kessler died in Indianapolis, Indiana, March 20, 1923, the Trinity River was improved and the levee system was completed in the 1930s. The Central Expressway was first opened to traffic in 1950, decades after the Kessler Plan called for its construction. In addition to a plan for Dallas, Kessler drafted city plans for Cincinnati, Indianapolis, Cleveland, El Paso, Denver, Longview, WA and Syracuse.

References 
Information above is taken from the Handbook of Texas Online: http://www.tshaonline.org/handbook/online/articles/fke44

Urban planning in the United States
History of Dallas
City plans